Letterstick Band are a band from north-east Arnhem Land in Australia. The members are from the An-Barra Clan on the coast near Maningrida. They are named after the wooden tools on which messages are carved to communicate between places. They play a mixture of reggae and rock that has been called saltwater rock and they sing in English and in Arnhem Land languages.

Letterstick Band won a Deadly for Band of the Year in 2001. They are the subjects of the documentary Diyama - Soundtracks of Maningrida.

Discography
 An-Barra Clan (1998) - CAAMA
 Diyama (2003) - CAAMA

References

Northern Territory musical groups
Indigenous Australian musical groups